Monrovia is a city in the foothills of the San Gabriel Mountains in the San Gabriel Valley of Los Angeles County, California, United States. The population was 37,931 at the 2020 census. Monrovia has been used for filming TV shows, movies and commercials.

History

Monrovia is the fourth-oldest general-law city in Los Angeles County and the L.A. Basin (after Los Angeles, Santa Monica, and Pasadena, all now charter cities). Incorporated in 1887, it has grown from a sparse community of orange ranches to a residential community of over 37,000.

Around 500 BC, the Tongva, a band of Shoshonean-speaking Indians, established settlements in what is now the San Gabriel Valley. They were called the Gabrieliño Indians by early Spanish missionaries, a tribe of Mission Indians. The Tongva were not farmers; they gathered wild seeds, berries, and plants along rivers and in marshlands. Abundant oaks in the Valley, such as Coast Live Oak and Interior Live Oak, provided a staple of the Tongva diet: acorn mush made of boiled acorn flour.

In 1769, the Portolà expedition was the first recorded Spanish (or any European) land entry and exploration of present-day California, then the Spanish colonial Las Californias Province of the Viceroyalty of New Spain (colonial México). In 1542, Juan Rodríguez Cabrillo claimed it from sea for the King of Spain. The expedition led by Gaspar de Portolà proceeded north from San Diego, passing through the area en route to Monterey Bay. Accompanying Portolà was Franciscan padre Juan Crespí, the expedition's diarist. Much of what is known of early California is from Crespi's detailed descriptions.

In 1771, Franciscans established the Mission San Gabriel Arcangel in the San Gabriel Valley. The mission continued after Mexican independence in 1822. In 1833, the Mexican Congress initiated secularization of the missions in Alta California, to begin seizure of mission properties for sale to private rancho grantees.

In 1841, Alta California Governor Juan Alvarado issued Mexican land grants for Rancho Azusa de Duarte to Andrés Duarte, a Mexican soldier; and for Rancho Santa Anita to Hugo Reid, a naturalized Mexican citizen of Scottish birth. Monrovia is made of parts of these two ranchos.

In the mid-19th century, most of Rancho Azusa de Duarte was subdivided and sold by Duarte to settle his debts. Some of those parcels became part of the ranch of William N. Monroe, Monrovia's eponym.

Rancho Santa Anita changed hands several times before the multimillionaire, silver baron and rancher E.J. "Lucky" Baldwin acquired it in 1875. That same year his Los Angeles Investment Company began subdividing and selling parcels from many of his ranchos. In 1883, 240 acres (970,000 m2) of Rancho Santa Anita were sold to Monroe for $30,000. Additional parcels of Rancho Santa Anita were sold to Edward F. Spence, John D. Bicknell, James F. Crank, and J.F. Falvey.

The completion of the Los Angeles and San Gabriel Valley Railroad in 1887, later sold to the Santa Fe (which would run through Monrovia) and Southern Pacific railroads to Southern California brought new people looking for homes and investment opportunities. With this in mind, Monroe, Spence, Bicknell, Crank, and Falvey combined their land under the business name of the Monrovia Land and Water Company in 1886, centered at Orange (now Colorado Boulevard) and Myrtle Avenues; the first tract extended from Magnolia Avenue on the west to Charlotte Avenue (Canyon Boulevard) on the east, a half block south of Walnut on the south and a half block north of Lime on the north. The subdivision was subdivided into 600  by  (1.84 acre) lots and sold.

The town was incorporated in 1887 under the leadership of prohibitionists who wished to control the arrival of an unwelcome saloon. The newly formed government's first order of business was to pass a tippler's law, prohibiting the sale of alcohol.

In 1903, the Monrovia News was established. The same year, the Pacific Electric was opened, providing transportation to and from Los Angeles, making it possible for Monrovia homeowners to work in Los Angeles.

In 1905, Carnegie funds became available and, with the help of the Board of Trade (forerunner to the Chamber of Commerce) and the Monrovia Women's Club, a bond issue was passed to purchase the Granite Bank Building to be used as a city hall, and to acquire property for a public park. The Granite Building has served as the city hall, fire and police department facilities since 1961 and the fire department since 1974. In 1956, the old Carnegie library building was torn down and a new library was constructed. In March 2007, a new library was voted on by the people of Monrovia. It won with 70% yes votes. The library now has 190,000 books, a heritage room for historical documents, and areas for children, teens, and adults.

A city council–manager type government was instituted in 1923.

In 1930, the Monrovia Airport, also known as the Foothill Flying Club, was commercially established. The small airstrip claimed to have had 12,000 paying customers use the airfield in 1932 and on May 19, 1938, the first airmail flight took off from Monrovia Airport. Ownership of the airport changed hands several times while it was in operation; pilots remembered it as "the friendliest little airport in the country." Apart from usage by Riley Brothers, TWA Captain and former airshow pilot Kalman Irwin, and Pancho Barnes, the airfield is well-known for its use as a movie-filming location. The first movie filmed at the Monrovia Airport was The Fighting Pilot. Other films shot at the airfield include 20,000 Men a Year, The Great Plane Robbery, and most notably, The Big Noise, featuring Laurel and Hardy. The 35-acre airfield, used as a runway as well as an airplane repair and storage service, was forced to close in 1953 after being sold to Consolidated Engineering Corporation for redevelopment as a result of increased land values.

Monrovia was the home to the precursor to McDonald's.

The Upton Sinclair House, home to activist and author Upton Sinclair, is in Monrovia and is a National Historic Landmark. In 1995, Monrovia received the All America City Award from the National Civic League.

Geography
Wildlife from the San Gabriel Mountains, including bears, bobcats, foxes, and mountain lions, roams some neighborhoods.

Demographics

2010
The 2010 United States Census reported that Monrovia had a population of 36,590. The racial makeup of Monrovia was 21,932 (59.9%) White (41.1% Non-Hispanic White), 4,107 (11.2%) Asian, 2,500 (6.8%) African American, 279 (0.8%) Native American, 76 (0.2%) Pacific Islander, 5,818 (15.9%) from other races, and 1,878 (5.1%) from two or more races. Hispanic or Latino of any race were 14,043 persons (38.4%).

The census reported that 36,434 people (99.6% of the population) lived in households, 61 (0.2%) lived in non-institutionalized group quarters, and 95 (0.3%) were institutionalized.

There were 13,762 households, out of which 4,725 (34.3%) had children under the age of 18 living in them, 6,295 (45.7%) were opposite-sex married couples living together, 2,073 (15.1%) had a female householder with no husband present, 778 (5.7%) had a male householder with no wife present. There were 793 (5.8%) unmarried opposite-sex partnerships, and 131 (1.0%) same-sex married couples or partnerships. 3,649 households (26.5%) were made up of individuals, and 1,276 (9.3%) had someone living alone who was 65 years of age or older. The average household size was 2.65. There were 9,146 families (66.5% of all households); the average family size was 3.24.

The population was spread out, with 8,514 people (23.3%) under the age of 18, 3,084 people (8.4%) aged 18 to 24, 10,733 people (29.3%) aged 25 to 44, 10,018 people (27.4%) aged 45 to 64, and 4,241 people (11.6%) who were 65 years of age or older. The median age was 37.9 years. For every 100 females, there were 91.6 males. For every 100 females age 18 and over, there were 87.0 males.

The homeowner vacancy rate was 1.3%; the rental vacancy rate was 4.9%. 18,478 people (50.5% of the population) lived in owner-occupied housing units and 17,956 people (49.1%) lived in rental housing units.

According to the 2010 United States Census, Monrovia had a median household income of $71,768, with 9.8% of the population living below the federal poverty line.

2000
As of the census of 2000, there were 36,929 people, 13,502 households, and 9,086 families residing in the city. The population density was 2,686.5 inhabitants per square mile (1,037.0/km2). The racial makeup of the city was 62.92% White, 8.67% African American, 7.02% Asian, 0.87% Native American, 0.13% Pacific Islander, 15.61% from other races, and 4.77% from two or more races. Hispanic or Latino of any race were 35.24% of the population.

There were 13,502 households, out of which 35.4% had children under the age of 18 living with them, 46.4% were married couples living together, 15.4% had a female householder with no husband present, and 32.7% were non-families. 26.0% of all households were made up of individuals, and 8.8% had someone living alone who was 65 years of age or older. The average household size was 2.71 and the average family size was 3.29.

In the city, the age distribution of the population shows 27.4% under the age of 18, 8.0% from 18 to 24, 34.0% from 25 to 44, 20.2% from 45 to 64, and 10.4% who were 65 years of age or older. The median age was 34 years. For every 100 females, there were 92.2 males. For every 100 females age 18 and over, there were 87.6 males.

The median income for a household in the city was $45,375, and the median income for a family was $49,703. Males had a median income of $41,039 versus $32,259 for females. The per capita income for the city was $21,686. About 9.7% of families and 13.1% of the population were below the poverty line, including 18.3% of those under age 18 and 9.7% of those age 65 or over.

Government and infrastructure

The Los Angeles County Department of Health Services operates the Monrovia Health Center in Monrovia.

Education

Public schools

Monrovia Unified School District operates public schools.

Monrovia High School was built in 1887. It was where Monroe School now stands, and housed the entire elementary and high school student body. A new high school on the property now occupied by Clifton Middle School was erected in 1905, and in 1912 was greatly expanded by the addition of new buildings. In 1928 a high school to serve the communities of Monrovia, Arcadia and Duarte was built. The same structure now serves only Monrovia students, as the elementary and high school district were unified into one district in 1961. The district now has one high school, one continuation school, two middle schools and five elementary schools.

The city's public schools are:
 Bradoaks Elementary School, K-5, 930 E. Lemon
 Canyon Early Learning Center, public pre-K, 1000 South Canyon
 Canyon Oaks High School (public alternative), 7-12, 930 Royal Oaks Drive
 Clifton Middle School, 6-8, 226 S. Ivy
 Mayflower Elementary School, K-5, 210 North Mayflower
 Monroe Elementary School, K-5, 402 W. Colorado
 Monrovia Community Adult School 920 South Mountain
 Monrovia High School 9-12, 845 W. Colorado Boulevard
 Monrovia Mountain School, public Alternative K-8, 950 S. Mountain Avenue
 Plymouth Elementary K-5, 1300 Boley Street
 Santa Fe Middle School 6-8, 148 W. Duarte Road
 Serendipity Early Care and Education Center, K, 940 W. Duarte Road
 Wild Rose Elementary, A California Distinguished School K-5, 232 Jasmine
 Vista Ridge Academy, 1311S. Shamrock

Private schools
 Calvary Road Baptist Academy, K-12, 319 W. Olive
 Church of the Nazarene, K-6 303 W. Colorado
 First Lutheran School, pre-K-8, 1323 South Magnolia
 First Presbyterian Church Preschool, 101 E. Foothill Boulevard
 Immaculate Conception School, K-8, 726 Shamrock

Lycée International de Los Angeles previously had its San Gabriel Valley campus in Monrovia. It opened in 1990 on the property of the United Methodist Church. Its area campus moved to Pasadena in 2006.

Miscellaneous education
 Joe Ferrante Music Academy, K-12, 126 E. Colorado Blvd.

Colleges and universities
The city is a part of the Citrus Community College District.

Media
Monrovia community news is provided by the San Gabriel Valley Tribune, published by Digital First Media, and Monrovia Weekly, a community newspaper published by Beacon Media News. Both newspapers have offices in Monrovia. Public access television is provided by KGEM-TV, which is available primarily to cable viewers, with some content online.

Transportation

Monrovia's main roads include Foothill Boulevard and Huntington Drive (historic Route 66). It is also served by the Foothill Freeway (I-210).

In 2016, Metro opened a new at-grade light rail station in Monrovia, Monrovia Station, at the intersection of Myrtle Avenue and Duarte Road. It is served by the Metro L Line. It is at the location of the former Santa Fe Depot, which still stands.

Economy
Original Tommy's, Trader Joe's, Green Dot and Naked Juice are based in Monrovia. Monrovia has a "Technology Corridor," primarily on Huntington Drive (old Route 66) east of Primrose Avenue, which includes AeroVironment, Tanner Research, Parasoft, Xencor, and ITT Deep Space Division.

Top employers
According to the city's 2021 Annual Comprehensive Financial Report, the top employers in the city are:

Popular culture
The house seen in the 1986 horror-comedy cult film House is at 329 Melrose Avenue in Monrovia.
The exterior house seen in the 2018 post-apocalyptic horror thriller film Bird Box, which was streamed worldwide on Netflix, is at 304 North Canyon Boulevard and the corner of East Greystone Avenue in Monrovia.

Notable people

 Kenny Baker, singer and actor
 Dicky Barrett, frontman, Mighty Mighty Bosstones, late-night TV announcer
 Corie Blount, basketball player, Los Angeles Lakers, Chicago Bulls
 Cisco Carlos, Major League Baseball pitcher
 Jason Earles, actor
 Mary Ford, vocalist and guitarist
 Jim Fuller, guitarist for The Surfaris (of "Wipeout" fame)
 Prince Gomolvilas, playwright
 Dean R. Hirsch, president of World Vision International
 Ernie Johnson, former baseball player and member of the New York Yankees first World Series championship team 1923
 Ian Johnson, American football player
 Katie Johnson, Mexican-American soccer player for the San Diego Wave in the NWSL
 Steven Kiyoshi Kuromiya, gay rights activist
 Ellis McCarthy, defensive tackle for Miami Dolphins
 Corky King, founder of Summum
 Scott Land, puppeteer/actor
 Don Mankiewicz, screenwriter and novelist
 Francis M. Pottenger, Jr., nutrition researcher
 Kim Rhode, three-time Olympic gold medalist (six medals total) in trap and skeet shooting
 Thomas J. Sargent, 2011 Nobel Prize in Economics, graduated from Monrovia High School in 1961
 Upton Sinclair and Mary Craig Sinclair, authors and producers
 Jacob Smith, actor
 William A. Spinks (1865–1933), champion carom billiards pro, co-inventor of modern billiards cue chalk, oil investor, and flower and avocado farmer (developer of the Spinks avocado cultivar); also maintained home and farm in nearby Duarte
 Leslie Van Houten, Monrovia High School graduate, Charles Manson follower
 Henry B. Walthall (1878-1936), actor
 The Fabulous Wonder Twins, entertainers

Ashley Sanchez Professional Soccer Player for the Washington Spirit in the NWSL and the USWNT

See also

 Baseball Reliquary

References

External links

  City of Monrovia website
 

 
1887 establishments in California
Cities in Los Angeles County, California
Communities in the San Gabriel Valley
Incorporated cities and towns in California
Populated places established in 1887